The Mask and Wig Club, a private club in Philadelphia, Pennsylvania, founded in 1889, is a historic collegiate musical comedy troupe. Created as an alternative to the existing theatrical and dramatic outlets at the University of Pennsylvania, Mask and Wig has presented comedy, music, and dancing to the University of Pennsylvania, Philadelphia, and audiences across the country. Its credo is "Justice to the stage; credit to the University."

The club's performers, or "The Cast," put on two all-original shows each year in collaboration with the Club's own Stage Crew, Band, and Business Staff.

A number of Mask and Wig original songs were made famous on the radio by mid 20th century recording artists. "The Gypsy in My Soul," written by Clay Boland and Moe Jaffe for a 1937 show, was recorded by Benny Goodman, Tommy Dorsey, and Ella Fitzgerald. "Daddy", written by Bobby Troup for a 1941 show, was recorded by Sammy Kaye, Glen Miller and the Andrews Sisters. Troup went on to write the jazz standard "Route 66," which was recorded by Nat King Cole, Bing Crosby (with the Andrews Sisters), and later the Rolling Stones. The first electrically recorded album ever released was Mask and Wig's "Joan of Arkansas," in April 1925.

In a September 30, 2021 press release, the club announced an initiative to remove gender as a qualification for membership, and to expand participation and membership to all genders for the first time in its 134-year history starting with the Fall 2022 recruitment cycle.

History
The Mask and Wig Club of the University of Pennsylvania was first conceived of in 1888 by a small group of undergraduates, led by Clayton Fotterall McMichael, who were interested in the stage and desired something the University did not offer: a troupe that would produce original humorous theatrical pieces. In 1889, therefore, McMichael and the other original founders sent out a call for undergraduate men to audition for the group and participate in the creation and production of its first performance.

McMichael and his peers envisioned a group that involved dressing up in frocks and performing spoofs and parodies.  Because colleges at the time were open only to young gentlemen, any production was limited to an all–male cast. These organizations naturally saw burlesque, which was quite popular in that era, as the perfect genre. The overblown characterizations, loose plotting, musical interludes, and parody of high art made the style perfect for a group of young, well-educated, amateur men, especially since the drag tradition came "built-in".

Founder McMichael combed the local bookstores for a story to produce and found it in Henry Byron's The Nymphs of the Lurleyburg. A substantially altered version, "Lurline", the Club's first production, hit the boards at the Chestnut Street Opera House on June 4, 1889, for one night only. Backed financially by the ladies of Philadelphia high society, the Club enjoyed great success in its early years. With increasingly reliable audience turnout and revenue from ticket sales, the runs were extended and the Club established a fine tradition among Philadelphia's theater-going society.  Moreover, the club made a very strong impression on campus and it achieved great notoriety within its first year of existence.

In 1894 the Club purchased a property at 310 South Quince Street to serve as a gathering place and rehearsal hall, the Mask and Wig Clubhouse.  The building had been erected by the first African-American Lutheran congregation in America as St. Paul's Lutheran Church in 1834, but had been sold in 1839 and converted into a coachhouse and stable, and later into a dissecting room for medical students. Prominent Philadelphia architect Wilson Eyre was commissioned to remodel the building and hired the young Maxfield Parrish, who would later become one of the greatest illustrators of the 20th century, to decorate the interior. The Grille Room was decorated with caricatures of members, a tradition that continues today, with the second century of members' caricatures continued upstairs at the entrance to the auditorium. Eyre expanded the clubhouse to its present size, 1901-1903.

The Club prospered throughout the late 19th and early 20th centuries. The middle of this century was a heady time for the Club.  Mask and Wig songs were the rage of the big band orchestras, radio shows, and solo acts of the day. The likes of Frank Sinatra, Glenn Miller, Tommy Dorsey, Benny Goodman, Count Basie, Rosemary Clooney, and Les Brown all covered Mask and Wig tunes. Between 1952 and 1958, the club appeared four times on The Ed Sullivan Show.  The 1961 production, Wry on the Rocks, introduced a satirical revue format in a cabaret atmosphere. In 1992, with Myth America, Mask and Wig returned the student–written book musical to its stage, a practice which continues to this day. Important in the show's success are the traditional high standards in the caliber of performers and excellence of the material performed. The Club's primary purpose has always been and continues to be, "Justice to the stage; credit to the University."

Immediately after the end of World War II the Mask and Wig dormitory on the residence quadrangle was used to house a U.S. Army unit assigned to quickly learn the Japanese language.  Upon the completion of the study, the soldiers were to be commissioned in the U.S. Army and serve in the Counterintelligence Corps (CIC) of the Army in Japan.  This army unit had classes in the University in the Egyptian Antiquities room while being scrutinized by several mummies.  Classes were also held in the Wharton School of Business.  Jerry Epple, a member of the Army Specialized Training Program, says he remembers to this day the stone carving of a mask and wig near the dormitory entrance.

Today, Mask and Wig maintains its position as one of the premier extracurricular activities on the Penn campus. Its yearly tour over spring break brings the show to alumni clubs across the nation.

Organization

Club organization
The Mask and Wig Club is unique in that it consists of both alumni and undergraduate members who have participated in the Annual Production. The Troupe consists of undergraduates who audition each fall and are selected into the various company sections (see below).

The Club produces the Annual Production and maintains and operates its own landmark theater at 310 South Quince Street (see below). The Clubhouse is a popular wedding and event venue in Philadelphia and was named "Best Party Venue" by Philadelphia Magazine in 2010.

Undergraduate sections
The Mask and Wig Club is made up of four distinct sections: the cast, the band, the crew, and the business staff.

The cast writes and performs material for productions.  The band functions as a pit orchestra, playing original, self-arranged pieces for the Undergraduate Fall Show, and professionally arranged pieces for the Annual Production.  The band also holds the headliner spot at the University of Pennsylvania's annual Spring Fling festival in the Quad. The crew builds elaborate, ornate, and completely original sets for Productions.  The business staff is responsible for advertising and selling tickets for the Club's shows.

Club Leadership

2022-2023 Board of Governors

Officers

President:   David E. Simon ’86

Vice-President:    Stephen R. Kossuth ‘03

Secretary:    Kyle S. Kozloff ’90

Treasurer:    Thomas P. Shannahan ’86

Business Manager:   Joshua F. Slatko ’00

Historian: Peter R. Kohn ’89

Governors At Large

Thomas A. Fanelli ’23 Undergraduate Chair

Eli D. Cohen ’23 Undergraduate Secretary-Treasurer

Eric D. Calvo ’19

Reed J. Cooper ’24

Mark J. Cronin ’86

Timothy M. Donza ’02

Kevin A. Feeley ’77

Michael C. Golisano ’05

Dylan W. Hurok ’23

Mark Li ’23

Wolete M. Moko ’12

Yoni M. Perla ’24

Neil M. Radisch ’86

Milan R. Savani ’17

J. Nicholas Seymour ’19

Joseph R. Zebrowitz, MD ’88

Matthew I. Weltmann ’23

Undergraduate Leadership

Undergraduate Chairman: Tom Fanelli

Undergraduate Secretary-Treasurer: Eli Cohen

Undergraduate Business Manager: Matthew Weltmann

Undergraduate Stage Manager: Dustin Brown

Undergraduate Band Leader: Aydan Gooneratne

Undergraduate Cast Director: David McCabe

Undergraduate Head Writer: Charlie Ross

Performances

Free Show
Free Show is the first Mask and Wig show of the academic year.  The show is held during the first week of the academic year and is free of charge to all new freshmen. The cast performs classic bits that are tried and true. Free Show serves a few purposes: it introduces the new freshmen of the University of Pennsylvania to one of Penn's oldest institutions and hopes to recruit new members by displaying what membership in the group entails. In 2018, for the first time, the Free Show was performed in collaboration with Penn's all-female musical sketch comedy troupe, Bloomers.

Undergraduate Fall Show
Each fall, the undergraduates produce their own sketch comedy show that runs for one week in a theater on Penn's campus.  The upperclassmen handle all aspects of production from acting direction to choreography to musical production.  A notable highlight of the show is the Second Act Opener, which consists of a medley of songs from a famous musician or group, but with parodied lyrics that often follow a Penn-centered plot. Past parodied musicians include Stevie Wonder, Michael Jackson, Billy Joel, The Beatles, Aerosmith, Disney, and Queen.

ComFest
In 1999, Mask and Wig established an annual Intercollegiate Comedy Festival to showcase the talent of the nation's best collegiate sketch comedy troupes. The mission of the festival is not just to put on a hilarious show that cultivates new talent, but also to honor and showcase a well-known comedian. Each host does a stand-up routine for the audience and participates in sketches with Mask and Wig. Past college sketch troupes include:
Princeton Triangle Club
University of Maryland Sketchup
Yale Fifth Humour
Boston College Hello Shovelhead
Cornell University Humor Us! Sketch Comedy

Past guest hosts include:
2000 Paul Provenza
2001 Ana Gasteyer
2002 Bob Saget
2003 Kevin Nealon
2004 Stephen Colbert
2005 Tim Meadows
2006 Gilbert Gottfried
2007 Dan Bakkedahl
2008 Kenan Thompson
2009 Judah Friedlander
2010 Tom Green
2011 Aasif Mandvi
2012 Greg Proops
2014 Tommy Pope

Annual Production "Spring Show"
The Annual Production, colloquially known as the "Spring Show", is the theatrical centerpiece of Mask and Wig.  Performed at The Mask and Wig Clubhouse, the production is an original show that runs from late January to early April.  While the format of the Spring Show has evolved over the years, the show currently runs as a full "book" musical comedy, complete with singing and tap dancing.

Unlike the Fall Show, the Annual Production is professionally composed, directed, and choreographed by some of the best talents in the industry.  The script, however, is written by the Club's cast.

Tour
During spring break the troupe takes their show around the country as they road trip across the United States, usually performing in areas with a high Penn alumni concentration.  The trip usually includes about four to six stops.  In recent years the tour has taken Wig to cities like London, Los Angeles, New York City, San Francisco, Las Vegas, Chicago, and Toronto.

The tour is yet another one of the group's many traditions.  In Mask and Wig's “heyday,” the group had its own train car that it would use to do a similar tour around the nation.

Spring Fling
The Mask and Wig Band traditionally headlines the last day of Spring Fling performances, which was historically a Saturday, at the stage in the Lower Quad. In 2018 the festival was moved to Penn Park along with the Mask and Wig performance.  They generally perform an hour-long set of covers of popular music.  Members of the cast generally sing with the band, along with female vocalists from other Penn performing arts groups.

List of Annual Productions

1889 Lurline
1890 Ben Franklin, Jr.
1891 Miss Columbia
1892 Mr. and Mrs. Cleopatra
1893 The Yankee League
1894 King Arthur
1895 Kenilworth
1896 No Gentleman of France
1897 Very Little Red Riding Hood
1898 The House That Jack Built
1899 Captain Kidd, U.S.N.
1900 Mr. Aguinaldo of Manila
1901 Baa, Baa, Black Sheep
1902 Old King Cole
1903 Sir Robinson Crusoe
1904 Alice in Anotherland
1905 Mr. Hamlet of Denmark
1906 Shylock & Co., Bankers
1907 Herr Lohengrin
1908 Uncle Sam's Ditch
1909 Merely a Monarch
1910 The Desert of Mahomet
1911 Innocents
1912 Miss Helen of Troy
1913 Maid in Germany
1914 The Royal Arms
1915 Paradise Prison
1916 Whoa-Phoebe!
1917 Mr. Rip Van Winkle
1918 The Bridal Not
1919 Revue of Revues
1920 Don Quixote, Esq.
1921 Somebody's Lion
1922 Tell Tales
1923 Here's Howe
1924 That's That
1925 Joan of Arkansas
1926 A Sale and A Sailor
1927 Hoot Mon!
1928 Tarantella
1929 This Way Out!
1930 John Faust, Ph.D.
1931 East Lynne Gone West
1932 Ruff Neck
1933 Out of the Blues
1934 Easy Pickens
1935 Drums Fortissimo
1936 Red Rhumba
1936 This Mad Whirl
1937 Fifty – Fifty
1938 All Around the Town
1939 Great Guns
1940 High as a Kite
1941 Out of this World
1942 Paoli Local
1944 Red Points and Blue
1945 Hep to the Beat
1946 John Paul Jones
1946 Chris Crosses
1947 Juleo and Romiet
1948 Alaska Right Away
1949 Adamant Eve
1950 Count Me In!
1951 Doctor, Dear Doctor!
1952 Here's Howe!
1953 The Golden Fleece
1954 Tempest in a Teapot
1955 Vamp ‘Till Ready
1956 Ring Around Rosie
1957 Free For All?
1958 Off the Top
1959 Wright Side Up
1961 Wry on the Rocks
1962 All at Sea
1963 Where Do We Go From Here?
1964 Sorry, Charlie, Your Time is Up
1965 Listen, They’re Playing Our Song
1966 About Farce
1967 Quick, Before It's Written
1968 All's Fair
1969 The Devil to Pay
1970 Wrought Irony
1971 Who's Whom
1972 Now Listen Hear
1973 Take Ten
1974 Film Flam
1975 Mystery Loves Company
1976 Is It Yesterday Already?
1977 S!R!O!
1978 Pow! Zowie! Zap!
1979 You Bet Your Assets
1980 Daze a Vu
1981 Hire and Higher
1981 Between the Covers
1983 You Gotta Have Art
1984 Urban and Soda
1985 Irreverence of Things Past
1986 Happily Ever Laughter
1987 Eureka!? I Hardly Know Ya!
1988 Lurline, Again!
1989 Pun & Crime–ishment
1990 Healthy, Wealthy, and Wry
1991 Around the World in a Daze
1992 Myth America
1993 Westward Who?
1994 A Sworded Affair
1995 Thugs and Kisses
1996 Hit or Mrs.
1997 Mystery Repeats Itself
1998 Blasphemy? Blasphe-you!
1999 From Here to Maturity
2000 History in the Faking
2001 All's Fair in Love and Dwarfs
2002 Star-Spangled Banter
2003 Riot on the Set
2004 All's Hell That Ends Well
2005 Birth of a Notion
2006 Yahweh or the Highway
2007 Troy Story
2008 West Wing Story
2009 Oh, The Humanities!
2010 A Cheshire Catastrophe
2011 A Volcanic Corruption
2012 A Reptile Dysfunction
2013 Beautopia: A Face Odyssey
2014 Wishful Sinking
2015 A Comedy of Terrors
2016 Flight Club
2017 No Place Like Rome
2018 Juice Box Hero
2019 The Book of Mermen
2020 Our Father who Aren't in Heaven
2022 Born in the USB
2023 A Doomsday in the Life

List of Undergraduate Fall Shows

1971 No, But I Read the Cliff Notes
1972 You Ain't Nothin' But A Blue Suede Shoe
1973 Don't Throw Money
1974 Holding the Bag
1975 [Sic] Humor
1976 FurKing in the Jungle
1977 All You Can Eat
1978 Parodies Lost
1979 Fill 'Er Up
1981 Ring Job
1982 Beau Jest
1983 Wit Or Witout
1983 No Eggrolls For Me Thank You I've Just Been Vaccinated
1984 Shooting Stars: A Hollywood Murder Musical
1985 Eat Wit and Die
1986 What a Drag
1987 Your Mother
1988 Pippin or Hamlet Prince of Denmark
1989 Sex, Lies and Masking Tape
1990 Saddam & Gomorrah
1991 Male Chauvinist Wyg
1992 Debauchery, Debacle and Decandlestickmaker
1993 Ah Brutus, You Kill Me
1994 Carpe Stouffer: Seize the Tray
1995 Freudian Slip
1996 Something To Do Before You Get Mugged
1997 What Willis Was Talking About
1998 Bidets of Thunder
1999 The End Of The World As We Wrote It
2000 You Are the Wind Beneath My Fingers, Wings and Other Things
2001 Win Ben Stein's Wife and Kids
2002 Less Miserable
2003 Donkey Donuts
2004 Waiting for Gutmann
2005 Hogan's Gyros
2006 Singin' in Bahrain
2007 Phallus in Wonderland
2008 Oil Vey!
2009 Conquistadora the Explorer
2010 Ra and UnTut
2011 Mario Brothers, Where Art Thou?
2012 Tights, Camera, Action!
2013 A State of Confucian
2014 An Eye for an Island
2015 No Country for Old Penn
2016 Magic Mike & Ike
2017 I Am What I Amazon
2018 Apollo 13 Going on 30
2019 Frights of the Round Table
2020 The We'll Fix it in Post Show with Marc McManus
2021 A Yarrr is Born
2022 Better Call Y'all

The Clubhouse

Clubhouse art
Working in his studio just a few blocks away at Thirteenth and Walnut Streets, Maxfield Parrish received one of his first commissions in 1894 from Mask and Wig.  This first job came as he was finishing his studies at the Pennsylvania Academy; it was for decoration of the stage proscenium and ticket window, illustration of a number of caricatures on the wall of the Grille Room, and most notably the Old King Cole mural.  This was the start of his professional career; shortly after seeing the mural, the editor of “Harper's” Magazine invited Parrish to do some of their covers for which he became famous.  He would continue working for the Club to finish a total of 35 caricatures and illustrate the earliest program covers.

Wilson Eyre was older and more established than Parrish when he began working on the Clubhouse, and was good friends with Parrish's father, Stephen.  Eyre was the architect in charge of renovating the Club's new home and transforming it from a stable into a “Bavarian” themed Clubhouse.  His first remodel in 1894 transformed the space from the stable by adding an entry hall with stairs, designing and decorating the Grille Room, and turning the second floor into a theater.  Eyre designed most of the furniture in the Grille Room; three of the original tables still exist and will be returned to the Clubhouse upon its reopening.  Eyre also oversaw the second major change.  The building was enlarged in 1903 by adding 10 feet to the front creating the façade that still exists there today.  Eyre's original drawing of the front design, created in 1902, is shown to the right.  Eyre's design has endured for over a century with few changes aside from the ongoing addition of paneling for caricatures in the Grille Room and Theater.  Though Eyre's career included several projects like the Clubhouse, he is best known for his design of the University of Pennsylvania’s Museum.

Clubhouse renovations
Immediately following the close of the 2007 Spring show, the clubhouse began to undergo an extensive renovation.  In addition to bringing the building up to modern code, the club also installed an elevator and central air conditioning unit.  The construction, originally projected to be complete in time for a normal Spring show run, experienced a number of delays and setbacks.  On the morning of March 15, 2008, a fire broke out in the attic of the clubhouse, setting back the completion date indefinitely.  While nothing of historical significance was critically damaged, the 2008 Spring show, "West Wing Story", could not go on in the club's signature theater.

Luckily, the club had a contingency plan in case of such an emergency and was able to put on their show.  "West Wing Story" played for two weekends in April 2008 at the Prince Music Theater in downtown Philadelphia, marking the first annual production to be performed at a venue other than the clubhouse since 1960.  The generosity of Mask and Wig's Graduate Club made it financially possible to perform in a professional theater.  With renovations still behind schedule in 2009, the annual production "Oh, the Humanities!" was also performed at the Prince Music Theater for three weekends, selling a record number of tickets due to the large theater capacity.

The clubhouse renovation was completed in the fall of 2009, allowing the club to once again return to its own stage for the 2010 Annual Production, "A Cheshire Catastrophe".

See also
List of traditional gentlemen's clubs in the United States

References

External links
The Mask and Wig Club

1889 establishments in Pennsylvania
Buildings and structures in Philadelphia
Clubhouses on the National Register of Historic Places in Philadelphia
Clubs and societies in the United States
Organizations based in Philadelphia
Arts organizations established in 1889
Performing groups established in the 1880s
Student theatre
Theatre companies in Philadelphia
Gentlemen's clubs in the United States
University of Pennsylvania
Washington Square West, Philadelphia